The women's team archery event at the 2015 European Games in Baku took place between 16 and 18 June.

Ranking round
The ranking round took place on 16 June 2015 to determine the seeding for the knockout rounds. 16 countries entered a full team complement of three archers, so all qualified for the knockout round. 
World rankings shown are correct at tournament start date.

Elimination rounds

References

Women's team
2015 in women's archery